Gęsicki/ Gesicki (feminine: Gęsicka/ Gesicka, plural: Gęsiccy) is a Polish surname, it could be associated with the Korwin, Suchekomnaty Ślepowron coat of arms. Notable people with the name include:

  (died 1701), Polish nobleman 
 Grażyna Gęsicka (1951–2010), Polish sociologist and politician
 Leo Gesicki (1891–1961), American politician and businessman
 Marian Gęsicki (born 1953), Polish runner 
 Mike Gesicki (born 1995), American football tight end
 Weronika Gęsicka, visual artist, 2019 Paszport Polityki award winner
  (1919–1944), Polish soldier, Operation Kutschera

Polish-language surnames